The 1907 New South Wales state election involved 90 electoral districts returning one member each. The election was conducted on the basis of a simple majority or first-past-the-post voting system.

In this election, 7 members did not stand for re-election, in 11 electorates the winning candidate received less than 50% of the votes, while 5 were uncontested.

There were 23 seats that elected a member from a different party, while a further 5 seats where the member retained the seat but changed from the Progressive Party to the Liberal Reform Party, continuing the demise of the Progressive Party, from a high of 42 seats at the 1901 election. Four months before the election the party had negotiated a coalition agreement with the Liberal Reform Party however this was rejected by a vote of parliamentary members. The party leader Thomas Waddell (Belubula) resigned and joined the Liberal Reform Party, and was followed by John McFarlane (The Clarence), Brinsley Hall (The Hawkesbury), John Gillies (Maitland) and John Perry (b 1845) (The Richmond). Of the remaining 10 former Progressive Party members, a further 5 lost their seats. For a comprehensive list, see .

Election results

Albury

Alexandria

Allowrie

Annandale

Armidale

Ashburnham

Ashfield

Balmain

Bathurst

Bega

Belmore

Belubula

Bingara

Blayney

Paddy Crick, Progressive Party, had won the seat at the 1904 election, however he was expelled from the Parliament in 1906. John Withington won the seat for the Liberal Reform Party at the 1907 by-election.

Botany

Broken Hill

Burrangong

Burwood

Camden

Camperdown

Canterbury

The Castlereagh

The Clarence

The Clyde

Cobar

Cootamundra

Corowa

The Darling

Darling Harbour

Darlinghurst

Deniliquin

Durham

The Glebe

Gloucester

Gordon

Gough

Goulburn

Granville

The Gwydir

Hartley

Hastings and Macleay

The Hawkesbury

Kahibah

King

The Lachlan

Lane Cove

Leichhardt

Liverpool Plains

SItting member John Perry (b 1849) had been elected as an  candidate at the 1904 election, and joined  in 1907.

The Macquarie

Maitland

Marrickville

Middle Harbour

Monaro

Mudgee

The Murray

The Murrumbidgee

The Namoi

Newcastle

Newtown

Northumberland

Orange

Paddington

Parramatta

Petersham

Phillip

Pyrmont

Queanbeyan

Raleigh

Randwick

Redfern

The Richmond

Rous

Rozelle

St George

St Leonards

This was the third and final contest for St Leonards between Edward Clark and Thomas Creswell. Clark, as the selected Liberal Reform candidate defeated Cresswell at the 1901 election. Creswell then defeated Clark to be selected as the Liberal Reform candidate in 1904, before comfortably beating him at the election. Cresswell however lost Liberal preselection for the seat in 1907 to John Carter, wth Clark defeating both Cresswell and Carter to regain the seat.

Sherbrooke

Singleton

Sturt

Surry Hills

John Norton (Independent) had won the seat at the 1904 election, however he challenged William Holman to face a by-election and was soundly defeated at the Surry Hills by-election in July 1906, finishing fourth behind Albert Bruntnell (Liberal Reform). At the 1907 general election Bruntnell chose to contest [[Results of the 1907 New South Wales state election#Alexandria|Alexandria]] but the seat was retained for Liberal Reform by Sir James Graham.

Tamworth

Tenterfield

The Upper Hunter

Waratah

Waverley

Wickham

Wollondilly

Wollongong

Woollahra

Wynyard

Yass

See also
 Candidates of the 1907 New South Wales state election
 Members of the New South Wales Legislative Assembly, 1907–1910

Notes

References

1907